Pardomima is a genus of moths of the family Crambidae described by Warren in 1890.

Species
Pardomima amyntusalis (Walker, 1859)
Pardomima azancla Martin, 1955
Pardomima callixantha E. L. Martin, 1955
Pardomima distortana Strand, 1913
Pardomima furcirenalis (Hampson, 1918)
Pardomima margarodes Martin, 1955
Pardomima martinalis Viette, 1957
Pardomima phaeoparda Martin, 1955
Pardomima phalaromima (Meyrick, 1933)
Pardomima phalarota (Meyrick, 1933)
Pardomima pompusalis (Walker, 1859)
Pardomima telanepsia Martin, 1955
Pardomima testudinalis (Saalmüller, 1880)
Pardomima viettealis Martin, 1956
Pardomima zanclophora E. L. Martin, 1955

Former species
Pardomima tumidipes (Hampson, 1912)

References

Spilomelinae
Crambidae genera
Taxa named by William Warren (entomologist)